Chae, also spelled Chai, is a Korean family name and an element in some Korean given names. Its meaning differs based on the hanja used to write it.

Family name

Overview
The 2000 South Korean Census found 119,251 people with the family name Chae. It could be written with any of three hanja, indicating different lineages. In a study by the National Institute of the Korean Language based on year 2007 application data for South Korean passports, it was found that 87.8% of people with this surname spelled it in Latin letters as Chae in their passports. Another 7.5% spelled it as Chai, 2.8% as Che, and 1.7% as Chea.

Most common (蔡)
 (성씨 채 songssi chae) is by far the most common of the three Chae surnames. This character is also used to write the Chinese family name pronounced Cài in Mandarin. The 2000 Census found 114,069 people and 35,099 households with this surname, divided among seventeen reported bon-gwan (clan hometowns, not necessarily the actual residence of clan members), as well as eighty-six people whose bon-gwan was not stated: 
Pyonggang, Kangwon (today in North Korea): 69,256 people and 21,373 households They claim descent from Chae Song-nyeon (채송년; 蔡松年), an official under Gojong of Goryeo. 
Incheon, Gyeonggi (today in South Korea): 37,391 people and 11,415 households They claim descent from Chae Seon-mu (채선무; 蔡先茂), who lived sometime during mid-Goryeo Dynasty.
Other or unreported bon-gwan: 7,422 people and 2,311 households

Second-most common (菜)
 (나물 채 namul chae) is the second-most common of the three Chae surnames. The 2000 Census found 3,516 people and 1,067 households with this surname, divided among two reported bon-gwan:
Yeongyang, North Gyeongsang (today in South Korea): 1,816 people and 576 households
Jinju, South Gyeongsang: 1,627 people and 483 households 
Other or unreported bon-gwan: 73 people and eight households

Least common (采)
 (풍채 채 pungchae chae, 캘 채 kael chae) is the least common of the three Chae surnames. The 2000 Census found 1,666 people and 566 households with this surname, with one reported bon-gwan:
Yeosan: 1,637 people and 562 households 
Other or unreported bon-gwan: 29 people and two households

People
People with these family names include:
 Esther K. Chae (Chae Kyung-ju), American actress of Korean descent
 Chae Eui-jin (채의진), South Korean voice actor
 Chae Eun-hee (채은희, born 1982), South Korean marathon runner
 Chae Gwang-jin (채광진, born 1994), South Korean League of Legends player
 Chae Ho-ki (채호기, 蔡好基, born 1957), South Korean poet
 Chae Hyung-won (채형원, 蔡亨源, born 1994), South Korean singer, DJ and member of Monsta X
 Chae Ji-hoon (채지훈, 蔡智薰, born 1974) South Korean speed skater
 Ji Young Chae (채지영, born 1993), South Korean ballet dancer
 Chae Jung-an (채정안, 蔡貞安, born Jang Jung-an, 1977), South Korean actress and singer
 Junseok Chae (채준석), South Korean engineer and academic administrator
 Chae Keun-bae (채근배, 蔡根培, born 1970), South Korean sport shooter
 Chae Man-sik (채만식, 蔡萬植, 1902–1950), Korean novelist
 Chae Min-seo (채민서, born Cho Soo-jin, 1981), South Korean actress
 Chae Myung-shin (채명신, 蔡命新, 1926–2013), South Korean army general
 Nelson Chai (채주석, Chai Joo-suk, born 1965), American investment banker of Korean descent
 Chae Ri-na (채리나, born Park Hyun-joo, 1977), South Korean singer
 Chae Shi-ra (채시라, 蔡時那, born 1968), South Korean actress
 Chae Su-chan (채수찬, 蔡秀澯, born 1955), South Korean politician and economist
 Chae Sung-bae (채성배, 蔡成培, born 1968), South Korean heavyweight boxer
 Chae Sang-byung (채상병, 蔡尙秉, born 1979), South Korean baseball player
 Chae Seon-ah (채선아, born 1992), South Korean volleyball player
 Chea Song-joo (채송주, born 1998), South Korean figure skater
 Chae Sang-woo (채상우, 蔡相宇, born 1999), South Korean actor
 Chae Soo-bin (채수빈, 蔡秀彬, born Bae Soo-bin, 1994), South Korean actress
 Chae YuJung (채유정, 蔡侑玎, born 1995). South Korea badminton player

In given names
There are 17 hanja with the reading Chae on the South Korean government's official list of hanja which may be registered for use in given names; they are:

 (나물 채 ): vegetable
 (캘 채 ): to lift
 (채색 채 ): colour
 (빚 채 ): debt
 (풍채 채 , 캘 채 ): appearance
 (사패지 채 ): fief
 (녹봉 채 ): stipend
 (성씨 채 ): used as a family name (originally a species of tortoise)
 (비단 채 ): silk
 (목책 채 ): wooden fence
 (옥빛 채 ): brightness of jade
 (진터 채 ): fort
 (비녀 채 ): binyeo (traditional Korean hairpin)
 (빚 채 ): debt
 (참나무 채 ): oak tree
 (여자의 자 채 ): used in women's names
 (주목할 채 ): to watch

Korean given names containing the element Chae include:
 Chae-won (feminine)
 Chae-yeon (feminine)
 Chae-young (feminine)
 Eun-chae (feminine)

See also
List of Korean family names
List of Korean given names

References

Korean-language surnames